Ghettotech (also known as Detroit club) is a genre of electronic music originating from Detroit.  It combines elements of Chicago's ghetto house with electro, Detroit techno, Miami bass.

Overview
Former Detroit music journalist for the Detroit Metro Times, Hobey Echlin describes ghettotech as a genre that combines "techno's fast beats with rap's call-and-response." It features four-on-the-floor rhythms and is usually faster than most other dance music genres, at roughly 145 to 160 BPM. Vocals are often repetitive, crude, and pornographic. As DJ Godfather puts it, "the beats are really gritty, really raw, nothing polished."

Ghettotech was born as a DJing style in the late 1980s, inspired by the eclecticism of The Electrifying Mojo and the fast-paced mixing and turntablism of Jeff "The Wizard" Mills. DJs would mix multiple genres including jungle, ghetto house, hip hop, R&B, electro and Detroit techno. The music of 2 Live Crew is also cited as influential to the genre.

A Detroit ghettotech style of dancing is called the jit. This dance style relies heavily on fast footwork combinations, drops, spins and improvisations. The roots of jit date back to Detroit jitterbugs in the 1970s. Chicago's equivalent dance style is Juke, where the focus is on footwork dating back to the late 1980s.

Ghettotech was an integral part of the Detroit Electronic Music Festival, an annual event.

Key record labels
Twilight 76
Databass
Electrofunk
 Jefferson Ave
Motor City Electro Company
 Intuit-Solar

References

Further reading

 "Ghettotech, The Bluffer's Guide"  article at Stylus Magazine.
 "Ghettotech" article at Global Darkness.
 "Ghetto tech" by Ethan Brown article.

External links
 

Music of Detroit
Music of Chicago
Bass (sound)
House music genres